Polygonum bolanderi is an uncommon California species of flowering plant in the buckwheat family known by the common name Bolander's knotweed.

Distribution
Polygonum bolanderi is endemic to northern California, where it is known from the northern Coast Ranges, the southern Cascades, and the northern Sierra Nevada (from Humboldt County and Shasta, south as far as Sonoma county and Tuolumne County). It can be found in open, rocky habitats.

Description
Polygonum bolanderi is a small shrub producing numerous very thin twiglike branches up to about half a meter (20 inches) long from a tough, tangled base. The slender branches are lined with small, narrow, pointed leaves which are alternately arranged and mostly found clustered toward the tips of the twigs. The leaves have narrow, fringed stipules with sharp points. Flowers occur in upper leaf axils during summer and fall. They are whitish or pink with dark midveins on each corolla lobe.

References

External links
Jepson Manual Treatment - Polygonum bolanderi
Polygonum bolanderi - Calphotos Photo gallery, University of California

bolanderi
Endemic flora of California
Flora of the Cascade Range
Flora of the Sierra Nevada (United States)
Natural history of the California Coast Ranges
Plants described in 1872
Flora without expected TNC conservation status